Hesar Qelij (also Romanized as Ḩeşār Qelīj; also known as Ḩeşār Qelīch) is a village in Qareh Chay Rural District, in the Central District of Saveh County, Markazi Province, Iran. At the 2006 census, its population was 230, in 49 families.

References 

Populated places in Saveh County